Leirskogen Church is a parish church of the Church of Norway in Sør-Aurdal Municipality in Innlandet county, Norway. It is located in the village of Leirskogen. It is the church for the Leirskogen parish which is part of the Valdres prosti (deanery) in the Diocese of Hamar. The white, wooden church was built in a long church design in 1924 using plans drawn up by the architects Bakken og Grimsgaard. The church seats about 90 people.

History
In the 1920s, a local initiative was taken for building a church in Leirskogen because the people desired a shorter journey to church. The architect for the construction was Bakken & Grimsgaard from Drammen. The lead builder for the project was Halvor Meisdalshagen. The interior furniture was designed by the architect Jens Dunker. The building was designed as a wooden long church with a tower on the west end above the church porch. Leirskogen Chapel, as it was originally titled, was consecrated on 18 March 1924. In 1934, a sacristy was built on the east end of the choir. It has been titled as a church since 1995.

Media gallery

See also
List of churches in Hamar

References

Sør-Aurdal
Churches in Innlandet
Long churches in Norway
Wooden churches in Norway
20th-century Church of Norway church buildings
Churches completed in 1924
1924 establishments in Norway